On August 28, 2017, a mass shooting occurred at the Clovis-Carver Library, a public library in downtown Clovis, New Mexico, U.S. The gunman fatally shot two people and injured four others. He was identified as Nathaniel Jouett, a 16-year-old student at nearby Clovis High School.

Shooting
The suspect entered the library at 4:15 pm MST on Monday, August 28, 2017, and went into the restroom. He began shooting shortly after he came out of the restroom.  At the time of the shooting, it was unclear how many people were in the library and Jouett seemed to fire randomly as individuals and parents with children tried to flee. According to an eyewitness, the gunman entered the library and shot into the carpet, shouting “Run! Why aren’t you running? I’m shooting at you! Run!” before he began to move about the room shooting at people.  Another witness claimed that Jouett looked happy, that "He was just laughing, smiling the whole time, until he came up real close to me, and then he put on that mean look."

Police received multiple emergency calls.  About 15 minutes after the first call came in, police received a call from the suspect's father, who told them that the suspect had taken his father's guns from the safe where they were kept, and left the house.

The suspect surrendered immediately when police arrived; he did not struggle with the arresting officers.  He told police that he had been planning an attack for a while, that he had intended to shoot up the school before killing himself.

Victims 
Two people, Wanda Walters, 61, and Kristina Carter, 48, both library employees, were killed.  Kristina Carter was the youth librarian and Wanda Walters worked at the circulation desk. Four people were wounded, who were identified  as Howard Jones, 53, Jessica Thron, 30, Alexis Molina, 20, and Noah Molina, 10.

Legal proceedings
According to Public Radio station KUNM, although the Associated Press usually refrains from using the names of juvenile defendants, it chose to publish Nathaniel Jouett's name "because of the seriousness of the crime and because authorities are seeking adult sanctions."

Curry County District Attorney Andrea Reeb announced prior to the trial that she intended to prosecute Jouett as an adult. The suspect made his first court appearance on August 31, 2017. Jouett was indicted on September 8, 2017 for two counts of first-degree murder, seven counts of child abuse, four counts of aggravated battery, and twenty counts of assault with intent to commit a violent felony.  

In April 2018, a judge denied a defense request to transfer Jouett from prison to a juvenile treatment facility, and ordered that he undergo a mental "evaluation and assessment" so that his mental health needs could be addressed. On October 17, 2018, Jouett pleaded guilty in the shooting. On February 15, 2019, Jouett was sentenced to two life sentences, with the possibility of parole, plus 40 years in prison. Jouett is currently incarcerated in the Lea County Correctional Center.

References

2017 in New Mexico
2017 mass shootings in the United States
2017 murders in the United States
Attacks in the United States in 2017
August 2017 crimes in the United States
Clovis, New Mexico
Deaths by firearm in New Mexico
Mass shootings in New Mexico
Mass shootings in the United States
Murder in New Mexico
2017 active shooter incidents in the United States